Oleksiy Volodymyrovych Shchebetun (born 2 June 1997) is a professional Ukrainian football forward who plays for Obolon Kyiv.

Career
Born in Zaporizhya, Schebetun is a product of the Metalurh Zaporizhya and Dynamo Kyiv sportive schools. His first trainer was Mykola Senovalov.

He played for FC Dynamo in the Ukrainian Premier League Reserves and in July 2017 he went on half year loan to FC Stal Kamianske in the Ukrainian Premier League. He made his debut in the Ukrainian Premier League for Stal Kamianske on 16 July 2017, playing in a match against FC Zorya Luhansk.

On 7 March 2018 he signed contract with Belarusian Premier League club Luch Minsk.

References

External links 

1997 births
Living people
Footballers from Zaporizhzhia
Ukrainian footballers
Association football forwards
Ukraine youth international footballers
Ukrainian expatriate footballers
Expatriate footballers in Belarus
Expatriate footballers in Lithuania
Ukrainian expatriate sportspeople in Belarus
Ukrainian Premier League players
Ukrainian First League players
Ukrainian Second League players
FC Dynamo Kyiv players
FC Stal Kamianske players
FC Luch Minsk (2012) players
FC Metalurh Zaporizhzhia players
FC Kramatorsk players
FC Obolon-Brovar Kyiv players
FC Obolon-2 Kyiv players